The County Donegal Railways Joint Committee operated an extensive  narrow gauge railway system serving County Donegal, Ireland, from 1906 until 1960. The committee was incorporated by an Act of Parliament in 1906, which authorised the joint purchase of the then Donegal Railway Company by the Great Northern Railway of Ireland and the Midland Railway Northern Counties Committee.

History of the Donegal Railways
On 1 May 1906, the Joint Committee was set up. The lines inherited by the Joint Committee totalled  and were:
 Finn Valley Railway (FVR) from Strabane to Stranorlar
 West Donegal Railway line from Stranorlar to Donegal 
 The Donegal Railway Company lines between Stranorlar and Glenties, Donegal Town to Killybegs, Strabane to Derry, and Donegal Town to Ballyshannon

By 1912 the company owned the following assets:
 Locomotives and rolling stock: 21 locomotives; 56 passenger vehicles; 304 goods vehicles
 Head offices and locomotive works at Stranorlar

The Strabane to Derry line was completely owned by the Midland Railway Northern Counties Committee, although it was operated by the CDJRC.

At its greatest extent, the County Donegal Railways Committee operated the largest narrow gauge railway system in the British Isles. The railway was affectionately known as the "Wee Donegal".

Dieselisation

Under the management of Henry Forbes, traffic superintendent from 1910 to 1943, the County Donegal Railways became pioneers in the use of diesel traction. The first diesel railcar was built in 1930 (the first diesel railcar anywhere in the British Isles), although a  petrol-engined railcar had been built in 1926 before standardisation on diesel traction in 1934.  Eight articulated diesel railcars were constructed by Walker Brothers of Wigan between 1934 and 1951, by which time virtually all passenger services were operated by diesel railcar, being much cheaper to operate than conventional steam trains.

The railcars could only be driven from one end and had to be turned on a turntable to make a return journey. As well, they could not be worked in multiple, so if two railcars were working back to back, both required a driver.  The railcars were incapable of hauling most freight wagons, so steam traction continued to be used on freight and excursion trains. The railcars could haul specially constructed trailers, and some lightweight freight wagons, which were painted red to distinguish them from the heavier wagons, which were grey.  A diesel locomotive named Phoenix (converted from a steam locomotive) was also used, but due to its noisy operation and slow speed (top speed of ), it spent most of its career shunting, travelling  during its working life.

Closure

The Glenties branch closed in 1947, the Strabane-Derry line closed in 1954, and the remaining passenger services ended on 31 December 1959. Much of the railway was closed on that date. Goods trains ran between Strabane and Stranorlar until 6 February 1960

In 1961, the two most modern diesel railcars were sold to the Isle of Man Railway.

Tourist attraction

Part of the line, which runs alongside Lough Finn near Fintown, has been re-laid as a tourist railway.

The Donegal Railway Heritage Centre has been established and contains historic details and artefacts of the CDRJC.

St. Connell's Museum, in Glenties has an extensive display of items from the railway.

The Foyle Valley Railway in Derry housed numerous CDRJC artefacts, although their future has been uncertain since the museum closed in 2015.

In preservation 
Several examples of CDRJC rolling stock has survived into preservation. Some examples are listed below by number, with their present location in brackets:
 Steam locomotives: 2 Blanche (UFTM), 4 Meenglas (FVR), 5 Drumboe (RPSI), 6 Columbkille (FVR)
 Diesel locomotives: 11 Phoenix (UFTM)
 Diesel railcars: 1 (UFTM), 10 (UFTM), 12 (FVR), 15 (DRC), 18 (FTR), 19 (IOMR), 20 (IOMR)
 Carriages: 1 (UFTM), 3 (UFTM), 5 (DRC) 14 (FVR), 28 (DRC), 30 (FVR)
 Goods wagons: 12 (DRC), 19 (FVR), 136 (UFTM), Unidentified horsebox (RPSI), Unidentified Van (DRC)
UFTM = Ulster Folk & Transport Museum; FVR = Foyle Valley Railway; RPSI = Railway Preservation Society of Ireland; FTR = Fintown Railway; DRC = Donegal Railway Centre; IOMR = Isle of Man Railway

See also
 List of narrow-gauge railways in Ireland
 County Donegal Railway locomotives

References

Further reading

Defunct railway companies of Ireland
Closed railways in Northern Ireland
Transport in County Donegal
Transport in County Londonderry
Transport in County Tyrone
British joint railway companies
1906 establishments in Ireland
1960 disestablishments in Ireland